Star Trek 4 is the working title of an American science fiction film in development at Paramount Pictures based on the television series Star Trek by Gene Roddenberry. It is intended to be the 14th film in the Star Trek film franchise and the fourth installment in the reboot series. There have been several different iterations of the film in development since 2015.

Development of a new Star Trek film following Star Trek Beyond (2016) was revealed before the release of that film, with J. D. Payne and Patrick McKay writing. In December 2017, Quentin Tarantino pitched his own idea for a new Star Trek film to producer J. J. Abrams, and development began separately from the Beyond sequel. S. J. Clarkson was hired to direct the latter in April 2018, but negotiations with stars Chris Pine and Chris Hemsworth ended that August with the actors leaving the project. Noah Hawley was hired in November 2019 to write and direct a new version of the franchise. Tarantino revealed in January 2020 that he had decided not to direct his Star Trek film. Hawley's version was placed on hold that August to allow Paramount to decide on the best direction for the franchise. Kalinda Vazquez was set to write the script for a new film in March 2021.

A separate script from Vasquez's was developed by Lindsey Beer and Geneva Robertson-Dworet, and Matt Shakman was hired to direct that film in July. The script was being re-written by Josh Friedman and Cameron Squires in November, and negotiations for the return of Pine and the rest of the main cast from the reboot series began in February 2022. Shakman left the film due to a schedule conflict that August, and Paramount began searching for a new director.

Background 
Shortly before filming for Star Trek Beyond began in June 2015, Paramount Pictures completed last-minute contract re-negotiations with the main cast members of the Star Trek franchise's reboot films. This gave the actors pay rises while signing Chris Pine and Zachary Quinto to return for a fourth film in their respective roles as James T. Kirk and Spock. While promoting the release of Beyond, producer J. J. Abrams revealed on July 15, 2016, that the fourth film would see Chris Hemsworth reprising the role of George Kirk, the father of Pine's character, from the prologue of  the first reboot film, Star Trek (2009). Abrams added that the role of Pavel Chekov would not be recast following the death of actor Anton Yelchin a month earlier. On July 18, Paramount Pictures officially announced a fourth Star Trek reboot film with the temporary title Star Trek 4. The announcement confirmed the return of Hemsworth and Pine as well as most of the main cast from Beyond, with Abrams producing alongside Lindsey Weber under their company Bad Robot Productions. J. D. Payne and Patrick McKay were hired to write the screenplay for the sequel after doing uncredited writing work on Beyond. David Ellison and Dana Goldberg of Skydance Media were set as executive producers.

While making a guest appearance on The Nerdist Podcast in December 2015, filmmaker Quentin Tarantino expressed interest in making a Star Trek film. He stated that he was a fan of the original Star Trek series as well as Abrams's 2009 reboot film, and felt that many classic Star Trek episodes could be "easily expanded" into a feature film; he gave the Star Trek: The Next Generation episode "Yesterday's Enterprise" (1990) as an example. In September 2017, after a clip of this discussion resurfaced on YouTube, Tarantino was asked about directing a Star Trek film and said "it would be worth having a meeting about". He noted that he planned to retire after directing ten films and had already made eight. Both Pine and Quinto separately stated earlier in 2017 that they had not heard any updates about a new Star Trek film other than it was being written. Karl Urban, who portrays Leonard McCoy in the films, reiterated this in September and expressed interest in having the fourth film introduce McCoy's ex-wife and daughter. That December, Tarantino approached Abrams and Paramount about an idea he had for a new Star Trek film, and development on the project began at the studio. At CinemaCon in April 2018, Paramount CEO Jim Gianopulos said the Beyond sequel and Tarantino's proposed film were both in development.

Quentin Tarantino 

Tarantino's story was based on the Star Trek episode "A Piece of the Action" (1968), which is set on an alien planet with an "Earth-like 1920s gangster culture". A few days after it was announced, Tarantino and Abrams convened a writers room consisting of Mark L. Smith, Lindsey Beer, Drew Pearce and Megan Amram, to hear the idea and begin developing it into a film. One of the group would be chosen to write a screenplay while Tarantino focused on his ninth film, Once Upon a Time in Hollywood (2019); Smith was considered to be the frontrunner. As part of their initial discussions, Abrams and Paramount agreed that the film could receive an R-rating like Tarantino's previous films, which would have made it the first R-rated Star Trek film.

Smith was hired to write the screenplay by the end of December. Paramount president Wyck Godfrey gave Tarantino's Star Trek film as an example of how the studio was rejuvenating its existing franchises, believing that "people's eyes light up" at the thought of the filmmaker joining the franchise. Previous Star Trek actors Patrick Stewart and William Shatner both expressed interest in returning to the franchise to work with Tarantino on his project. They previously portrayed Jean-Luc Picard in Star Trek: The Next Generation and James T. Kirk in Star Trek: The Original Series, respectively. Quinto assumed that the cast of Abrams's films would be starring in Tarantino's, which Simon Pegg, who portrayed Montgomery Scott in the Abrams films, soon reiterated. In April 2018, Tarantino's film was believed to be set in a different timeline from the Beyond sequel, and had the potential to be another reboot of the franchise.

Tarantino confirmed in May 2019 that his Star Trek film was still in development, explaining that the script had been written and he would return to the project following the release of Once Upon a Time in Hollywood that July. A month later, he said he would be giving notes on the script once he had the chance to and confirmed that the film would be rated R. In July, Tarantino said he had read Smith's script and liked it, but there were elements that he wanted to work on. He described the film as "Pulp Fiction in space". He also said that he was a fan of the performances of Pine and Quinto in Abrams's films and wanted them to star in his film, but he wanted his story to be a direct prequel to the original Star Trek series rather than being set in an alternate timeline like Abrams's films are; when discussing the different timelines with Abrams, Tarantino had said "I don't understand this, I don't like it", and Abrams encouraged him to ignore them entirely.

When asked how a Star Trek film would fit into his ten film plan, Tarantino acknowledged that he could use a loophole by saying "Star Trek doesn't count" and then make a tenth original film, but suggested that he would rather commit to making ten films whether that tenth film is part of the Star Trek franchise or not. In December 2019, Tarantino said he was "steering away" from directing the film but had made no official decision. A month later, he confirmed that he was not going to direct the film. He did think it was a good idea for a Star Trek film and suggested that it still be made, offering to give notes on the first cut.

S. J. Clarkson 

S. J. Clarkson entered talks to direct the Beyond sequel in April 2018. Abrams and Paramount had held an extensive search for a female director, and Clarkson would have been the first woman to direct a Star Trek film. Payne and McKay had completed the screenplay, but Paramount had yet to sign new contracts for the main cast outside of Pine and Quinto, including Urban, Pegg, John Cho (Hikaru Sulu), and Zoe Saldaña (Nyota Uhura). After Clarkson joined the film, Quinto said the project was entering the "logistical kind of phase" and expressed excitement at working with the director again after they both worked on the television series Heroes. In July 2018, Jennifer Morrison expressed interest in reprising her role as George Kirk's wife Winona from Star Trek (2009), and Danai Gurira was close to being cast in the film. Pegg met with Clarkson to discuss the project and expected production to begin in early 2019.

Contract negotiations between Pine, Hemsworth, and the studios ended with Pine and Hemsworth leaving the film in August 2018. The pair had existing deals for the film after Pine had signed on in June 2015 and Hemsworth had been attached in July 2016, but Paramount and Skydance wanted to lower the budget for the film following the financial underperformance of Beyond, and wanted to decrease the actors' salaries as part of this. Development of the film was expected to continue without Pine and Hemsworth, as it was considered a priority project for the studios. Negotiations with Saldaña, Quinto, Urban, Pegg, and Cho had not yet begun by that point, as they had been waiting until talks with Pine and Hemsworth had been completed. At the end of the month, Urban said production for the film was expected to take place in the United Kingdom, where Clarkson is based, and that it was just waiting on negotiations with Pine and Hemsworth to resume. Pine said a month later that he still wanted to make the film, adding, "we will see what happens". Despite this, the film had been cancelled by January 2019 and Clarkson moved on to other projects.

In May 2019, Hemsworth said he had turned down the film because he was underwhelmed by the script. Payne and McKay revealed in October 2022 that they had worked on the script for two and a half years with Clarkson and producer Lindsey Weber. The story was inspired by the Next Generation episode "Relics" (1992) in which Montgomery Scott is discovered to be alive many years after his presumed death inside a transporter buffer. In Payne and McKay's script, the Enterprise crew explore the wreckage of the USS Kelvin and discover that George Kirk had saved a copy of himself before the ship exploded and is now able to interact with his son. The writers described the story as a father-son galactic adventure featuring a similar relationship to that between Indiana Jones and his father Henry in Indiana Jones and the Last Crusade (1989). They added that the film had an original villain and was based on a core science fiction idea inspired by 2001: A Space Oddyssey (1968).

Noah Hawley 

Noah Hawley was hired to write and direct a new Star Trek film for Paramount in November 2019, which he would produce under his 26 Keys Production company alongside Abrams. The film was set to feature a new plot different from the George Kirk time travel premise and also separate from Tarantino's story idea, though the film was expected to be a sequel to Beyond and see Pine, Quinto, Urban, and Saldaña all return. Paramount and Skydance were hopeful that negotiations with the cast would be more successful without Hemsworth and with a new story.

In January 2020, Hawley said he would begin work on the film after completing the fourth season of his television series Fargo. He added that calling the film Star Trek 4 was a misnomer and reports of the Beyond cast returning were not necessarily correct, explaining that he had approached Paramount with his own vision for the franchise that was going to be different from previous films, and would likely involve new characters. It was important to Hawley to tell a new story that was respectful of the source material as he did with Fargo and Legion, and he specifically talked about evoking the Star Trek values of "exploration and humanity at its best, and diversity and creative problem solving". He referenced a scene from Star Trek II: The Wrath of Khan (1982) in which Kirk "puts on his reading glasses and lowers Khan's shields. It doesn't cost anything. But it's that triumphant feeling about [out]smarting your enemy" that Hawley wanted to recreate. Hawley discussed the film with his frequent composer Jeff Russo, who coincidentally was already the composer for the television series Star Trek: Discovery and Star Trek: Picard. Russo was excited about the possibility of working on Hawley's film, and said they discussed Hawley's story and intentions for the film's music. Russo began composing musical themes for the film.

In February, ViacomCBS CEO Bob Bakish said Paramount was only developing one new Star Trek film. Hawley was still working on the film in May, during the COVID-19 pandemic. That July, Robert Sallin—the producer of Star Trek II: The Wrath of Khan—revealed that he had a concept for a new Star Trek film that he was writing a script for. He said it would be "unlike anything that has been done in Star Trek" before. Sallin had discussed his concept with Paramount, but had been told that the studio would not consider any other pitches for Star Trek films until they had seen Hawley's script. Hawley's project was placed on hold in August 2020 by new Paramount Pictures president Emma Watts, whose top priority at the studio was to figure out the direction of the Star Trek franchise. Hawley still intended to direct the film, and later confirmed that it was going to feature new characters. His added that his story had an explicit connection to the existing Star Trek canon in a similar way to how the first season of Fargo has a story connection to the 1996 film of the same name. The screenplay also reportedly featured a deadly virus plot that could be considered "awkward" due to the pandemic. Hawley said the film was "very close to production" when Watts put it on hold, with casting underway, filming set to take place in Australia, and Hawley preparing to move to that country at the time.

Re-assessment 
In addition to Hawley's film, Watts was considering two other options for the future of the franchise: a new attempt at a sequel to Beyond featuring the cast of the previous films, or a new film that revisited Tarantino's story idea but with a new director. Deadline Hollywoods Mike Fleming Jr. suggested that a film featuring the previous cast may have the "cleanest path" forward, with the Hawley and Tarantino films deemed more suitable as spin-offs from the core franchise akin to the X-Men franchise's Logan (2017). Fleming added that the next film would need "an emphasis on boosting overseas gross numbers which have never been the franchise's strong suit". In September 2020, Hawley said his film was "still alive, just in stasis", but that November he said it did not "appear to be in [his] immediate future" anymore. Also during 2020, The Wrath of Khan director Nicholas Meyer wrote a detailed proposal with his producing partner Steven-Charles Jaffe for a new Star Trek project, including a treatment and illustrations. Meyer said the project was not connected to any of the franchise's previous films and was set in a gap in the Star Trek timeline where an original story could be told with new characters. He described the project as a feature film, but said it could also be a television series or a combination of television and film. Meyer and Jaffe presented this proposal to Star Trek television producer Alex Kurtzman, Abrams, and Watts, but had not heard anything back from Paramount by March 2021. At that time, Paramount set Star Trek: Discovery writer Kalinda Vazquez to write the script for a new Star Trek film, based on her own original idea, with Abrams's Bad Robot producing. A month later, the studio scheduled an untitled Star Trek film for release on June 9, 2023.

Matt Shakman 
After his success directing the Marvel Studios miniseries WandaVision (2021), Matt Shakman turned down several offers in favor of directing the next Star Trek film, signing a deal by mid-July 2021. Watts had pushed hard to hire Shakman for the project, and his signing was considered to be a coup for her. Abrams was confirmed to be producing the film, with a screenplay written by Beer and Geneva Robertson-Dworet that was separate from the script that Vazquez was hired to write. Shakman's film was set for the June 2023 release date, and was said to be moving at "warp speed" after his hiring ahead of a planned filming start in early to mid-2022. No deals with cast members had been made at that point, but Paramount hoped for Pine and the other main cast from his previous films to return. Due to the length of time with no new Star Trek films after Beyond, the studio decided to do market research to determine whether audiences were still interested in the previous cast. Paramount chose to bring them back after determining that there was "lasting audience enthusiasm" for the group. In November 2021, the film's release was pushed to December 22, 2023, to make room in Paramount's schedule for the delayed Transformers: Rise of the Beasts (2023). By then, Josh Friedman and Cameron Squires were re-writing the film's script.

Abrams and new Paramount Pictures CEO Brian Robbins announced during a Paramount investor event in February 2022 that the main cast from the previous three Star Trek films would be returning, including Pine, Quinto, Pegg, Urban, Saldaña, and Cho. Borys Kit and Aaron Couch of The Hollywood Reporter said the announcement was a breakthrough following the previous failed attempts to continue the franchise, though it came as a surprise to the actors and their agents as negotiations had not yet begun for their return. Pine would be the first cast member to subsequently enter early negotiations because he was considered to be the "lynchpin" for the project. Kit and Mia Galuppo explained for The Hollywood Reporter that the script was still being worked on and an official budget or greenlight had yet to be given by Paramount. The budget would now likely need to take into account larger actor deals since Paramount had given up its negotiating leverage by making the announcement first. The studio chose to do that so they could promote the film during the investor event, and was willing to pay more for the cast than during initial negotiations with Pine in 2018 due to the different entertainment landscape: larger acting deals had become more common in the streaming era, Paramount had new executives and was in a stronger financial position, and the studio needed to provide content for the streaming service Paramount+. Star Trek was considered to be a key franchise in the service's international expansion due to its science fiction storytelling and diverse cast.

Pine stated in March 2022 that he had not seen a new script for the film, but the cast was excited to return to the franchise. Saldaña reiterated this, and both actors said the group felt they would be honoring Yelchin's memory by continuing the series. Urban expressed interest in returning for the new film, but noted that he had a potential scheduling conflict with the filming of his series The Boys. Pine suggested in April that the next film should have a smaller budget and focus on pleasing existing Star Trek fans rather than hoping to make as much money as a Marvel Studios film or entice non-Star Trek fans, saying, "Let's make the movie for the people that love this group of people, that love this story, that love Star Trek. Let's make it for them and then, if people want to come to the party, great. But make it for a price and make it, so that if it makes a half-billion dollars, that's really good." That July, Variety reported that Pine's salary for the film was US$13 million. Shakman left the film a month later after rejoining Marvel Studios to direct Fantastic Four (2025). Paramount lamented that "the timing didn't align" for him to work on both. The film was still considered a top priority for the studio who immediately began searching for a new director, but it was removed from the company's release schedule soon after. 

There had been no further updates on the film by January 2023, when Sofia Boutella expressed interest in reprising her Beyond role as Jaylah in the next film. A month later, Shakman said it was a shame that he had not been able to "make the timing work" for the project. He declined to reveal any details about the story because he believed the version of the film that he had been working on was still in development. At the start of March, Abrams said the search for a new director was underway and expressed his view that the story for the next film was as compelling as the story for the 2009 reboot film. Pine had still yet to read a script for the next film by then.

References

External links 
 

Bad Robot Productions films
Paramount Pictures films
Production of specific films
Skydance Media films
Star Trek (film franchise)